The Dutch Eredivisie in the 2002–03 season was contested by 18 teams. PSV won the championship.

League standings

Results

Promotion/relegation play-offs

Top scorers

See also 
 2002–03 Eerste Divisie
 2002–03 KNVB Cup

References 

 Eredivisie official website - info on all seasons 
 RSSSF

Eredivisie seasons
Netherlands
1